Alberto Elli (born 9 March 1964) is an Italian former road racing cyclist, who wore the yellow jersey for 4 days in the 2000 Tour de France.
Elli was called up late for the 2000 Tour de France, and after a group of 12 cyclists stayed away from the others, Elli became a surprise leader, being the second oldest cyclist in the peloton. He kept the yellow jersey until the Pyrenées mountains, where he lost it to Lance Armstrong.

After retiring, he worked as a directeur sportif for several professional teams.

During the 2001 Giro d'Italia, the police found banned substances in Elli's hotel room. In October 2005, he received a six-month suspended sentence by San Remo Judge Paolo Luppi.

Major results
Source:

1986
 1st Piccolo Giro di Lombardia
1987
 2nd Road race, National Road Championships
 2nd Coppa Ugo Agostoni
 9th Overall Giro del Trentino
1988
 5th GP Industria & Artigianato
1989
 1st Stage 3 (TTT) Giro d'Italia
1990
 3rd Tour du Haut Var
 3rd Giro della Provincia di reggio Calabria
 4th Giro di Toscana
1991
 1st Stage 2 (TTT) Tour de France
1992
 1st Overall Hofbrau Cup
1st Stage 2
 1st Stage 4 Tour de Luxembourg
 2nd Giro del Veneto
 3rd Coppa Bernocchi
 4th Gran Premio Città di Camaiore
 5th Trofeo Matteotti
 9th Coppa Ugo Agostoni
 10th Giro di Romagna
1993
 1st Trofeo Matteotti
 1st Milano–Vignola
 5th Overall Hofbrau Cup
 5th Overall Tour de Luxembourg
 5th Coppa Ugo Agostoni
 6th Overall Tirreno–Adriatico
 6th Overall Settimana Internazionale Coppi e Bartali
 6th Giro di Romagna
 7th Giro dell'Emilia
 7th Tre Valli Varesine
 8th Züri-Metzgete
1994
 4th Overall Tirreno–Adriatico
 4th Overall Critérium International
 5th Overall Settimana Internazionale Coppi e Bartali
1st Stage 6
 7th Overall Tour de France
1st Stage 3 (TTT)
 7th Giro di Romagna
 7th Trofeo Matteotti
 7th Gran Premio Città di Camaiore
 9th GP Industria & Commercio di Prato
 10th Liège–Bastogne–Liège
 10th Giro dell'Emilia
 10th Giro dell'Appennino
1995
 1st Criterium d'Abruzzo
 3rd Giro di Toscana
 3rd Wincanton Classic
 4th Overall Euskal Bizikleta
1st Stages 1 & 3
 6th Amstel Gold Race
 6th Giro dell'Appennino
 8th Giro di Romagna
 8th GP Industria & Commercio di Prato
 10th Gran Premio Città di Camaiore
1996
 1st Overall Tour de Luxembourg
1st Stage 1
 1st Gran Premio Città di Camaiore
 1st Stage 4a Euskal Bizikleta
 2nd Trofeo Matteotti
 2nd Coppa Ugo Agostoni
 5th Giro di Romagna
 6th Overall Tour de Suisse
 7th Giro del Piemonte
 9th Coppa Sabatini
 10th Coppa Placci
1997
 1st Overall Grand Prix du Midi Libre
 2nd Overall Tour de Luxembourg
 2nd Milan–San Remo
 3rd Overall Tour de Langkawi
 5th Tre Valli Varesine
 6th Classique des Alpes
 7th Josef Voegeli Memorial
 8th Züri-Metzgete
1998
 1st Overall Vuelta a Murcia
1st Stages 3 & 5
 1st Stage 5 Tour of the Basque Country
 2nd Overall Étoile de Bessèges
 2nd Coppa Bernocchi
 3rd La Flèche Wallonne
 3rd Road race, National Road Championships
 4th Giro dell'Emilia
 4th Gran Premio Bruno Beghelli
 5th Overall Volta a Catalunya
 6th Giro della Provincia di reggio Calabria
 7th Overall Tour de Luxembourg
 8th Overall Route du Sud
 9th Amstel Gold Race
 10th Milan–San Remo
1999
 2nd Overall Vuelta a Castilla y León
 2nd Coppa Ugo Agostoni
 3rd Road race, National Road Championships
 3rd Josef Voegeli Memorial
 4th GP Ouest–France
 7th Overall Tour de Luxembourg
2000
 1st Overall Tour de Luxembourg
 1st Grand Prix de Wallonie
 1st Stage 1 (TTT) Tour de Suisse
 2nd Overall Rapport Toer
1st Stage 1
 4th Overall Vuelta a Murcia
1st Points classification
 4th Rund um den Flughafen Köln-Bonn
2001
 2nd GP du canton d'Argovie

Grand Tour general classification results timeline
Source:

References

1964 births
Living people
People from Giussano
Italian male cyclists
Cyclists from the Province of Monza e Brianza